Katherine Day (January 7, 1889 – March 12, 1976) was a Canadian artist.

She was born in Orillia, Ontario, and received a BA from Queen's University. She then became a social worker. During World War I, Day was a volunteer nursing assistant in England. From 1922 to 1923, she studied painting with Franz Johnston at the Winnipeg School of Art and then attended the Ontario College of Art from 1929 to 1930. She continued her studies at the Central School of Arts and Crafts in London and then studied with Nicolas Eekman and Henri Jannot in Paris. On her return to Canada, she became a member of the Canadian Society of Graphic Artists and of the Society of Canadian Painter-Etchers and Engravers; Day participated in exhibitions with both of these groups.

She died in Orillia at the age of 87.

One of her woodcut prints is included in the collection of the National Gallery of Canada.

References 

1889 births
1976 deaths
Alumni of the Central School of Art and Design
Artists from Ontario
Canadian women painters
20th-century Canadian printmakers
People from Orillia